Luis Soffner (born January 15, 1990) is former American soccer player who last played for the New England Revolution in Major League Soccer.

Career
On January 17, 2013, Soffner was drafted in the second round of the 2013 MLS SuperDraft (36th overall) by the New England Revolution.  After not making a single appearance for the club in 2013, Soffner was loaned to USL Pro affiliate club Rochester Rhinos for the 2014 season.  He made his professional debut on April 5, 2014 in a 3–1 loss to defending USL Pro champions Orlando City.

As of 2018 Soffner works as a property manager in South Carolina.

References

External links

Indiana University

1990 births
Living people
American soccer players
Association football goalkeepers
Indiana Hoosiers men's soccer players
NCAA Division I Men's Soccer Tournament Most Outstanding Player winners
New England Revolution draft picks
New England Revolution players
Rochester New York FC players
Soccer players from St. Louis
USL Championship players